Jambhavan may refer to:

 Jambavan, a character originating in Indian mythology: the King of the Bears, a bear in Indian epic tradition but a monkey in other scriptures
 Jambhavan (film), a 2006 Indian Tamil action film directed by Nandakumar and produced by Rajalakshmi Kalaikudam